The Greater Journey: Americans in Paris is a 2011 non-fiction book by the Pulitzer Prize-winning author David McCullough. In a departure from McCullough's most recent works, Founding Fathers like Benjamin Franklin and Thomas Jefferson, who spent time in Paris, are not covered. Instead, the book is about 19th-century Americans like James Fenimore Cooper and Samuel Morse, who migrated to Paris and went on to achieve importance in culture or innovation. Other subjects include Elihu Washburne, the American ambassador to France during the Franco-Prussian War, Elizabeth Blackwell, the first female doctor in the United States, Charles Sumner who studied at the Sorbonne and went on to become an American politician, and American artists who worked in Paris such as George Healy, Mary Cassatt, and Augustus Saint-Gaudens.

References

External links
 Official Site at Simon & Schuster
 Author Site at Simon & Schuster
Part one of C-SPAN Q&A interview with McCullough about The Greater Journey, May 22, 2011
Part two of C-SPAN Q&A interview with McCullough about The Greater Journey, May 29, 2011
Presentation by McCullough on The Greater Journey at the National Book Festival, September 25, 2011

2011 non-fiction books
France–United States relations
History books about France
History books about the United States
Books by David McCullough
Simon & Schuster books